New Franklin is an unincorporated community in northeastern Paris Township, Stark County, Ohio, United States, lying at the intersection of State Routes 172 and 183. The community is part of the Canton–Massillon Metropolitan Statistical Area.

New Franklin was not officially platted. A post office was established at New Franklin in 1832, and remained in operation until 1915.

References

Unincorporated communities in Stark County, Ohio
Unincorporated communities in Ohio